The men's 4 × 100 metres relay event at the 1951 Pan American Games was held at the Estadio Monumental in Buenos Aires on 5 and 6 March.

Medallists

Results

Heats

Final

References

Athletics at the 1951 Pan American Games
1951